Jason Beckford-Ball, MA, RMN is Editor of the British Journal of Nursing (BJN). He became Editor in March 2009, having advanced from assistant editor.

Background
Beckford-Ball was a qualified mental health nurse before studying English Literature at London University. He became a freelance journalist, later specializing in medical issues. He has written numerous articles on nursing and health-related issues for such titles as British Journal of Midwifery, Nursing Times, Dermatological Nursing, Continence UK, et al.

In 2006 he won a Nursing Times Award for his services as Deputy Clinical Editor, Nursing Times

External links
http://www.cision.net/tag/jason-beckford-ball/
http://www.continence-uk.com/journal/downloads/0201_harrogate.pdf

References

Alumni of the University of London
British editors
British male journalists
Nurses from London
British non-fiction writers
Writers from London
Year of birth missing (living people)
Living people
Place of birth missing (living people)